Filip Mešár (born 3 January 2004) is a Slovak junior ice hockey forward currently playing for the Kitchener Rangers of the Ontario Hockey League (OHL) as a prospect to the Montreal Canadiens of the National Hockey League (NHL). Mešár was selected by the Canadiens in the first-round, 26th overall, in the 2022 NHL Entry Draft.

Playing career

Slovakia
Mešár began his professional career with HK Poprad, competing first with the under-16 and under-18 teams. He moved up to the senior team in the Tipos Extraliga for the 2020–21 season. He was only 16 when he entered the adult league, noting later that some of his teammates had children his own age, and attracted media attention when he scored a goal on his first shift. He played 36 games in the regular season, and then participated in the team's deep run to the playoff finals, where they were defeated by HKM Zvolen. 

Mešár submitted his name for the 2021 CHL Import Draft and was selected ninth overall by the Kitchener Rangers of the Ontario Hockey League (OHL). However, he opted to remain in Slovakia for the following season, saying that he was "satisfied with the management of the club and the conditions I have here for my further advancement." In the 2021–22 season, Mešár managed eight goals and eight assists in 37 games. In the playoffs he managed three goals and an assist in six games in the first round, before Poprad was eliminated by HK Nitra.

North America

2022 NHL Entry Draft
In advance of the 2022 NHL Entry Draft, Mešár was widely rated as a possible selection late in the first round or early in the second round. On July 7, the Montreal Canadiens selected Mešár twenty-sixth overall (using a pick acquired in trade from the Calgary Flames for Tyler Toffoli). The Canadiens had also selected his longtime friend and national teammate Juraj Slafkovský first overall, to both men's satisfaction. The draft was a "historic" night for Slovak hockey, with Slafkovský and Šimon Nemec occupying the top two spots, and Mešár's giving the country three first round selections for the first time.

On July 14, Mešár signed a three-year entry level contract with the Canadiens. The team's general manager, Kent Hughes, suggested that Mešár's next step was undecided, but that he would likely play either in the OHL with the Rangers or in the American Hockey League with the Canadiens' affiliate Laval Rocket.

Kitchener Rangers (2022–present)
After participating in the Canadiens' preseason camp, Mešár was reassigned to the Rocket's training. He made his AHL debut on October 14, 2022, playing on the fourth line in a 6–5 overtime loss to the Belleville Senators. The following day, it was announced that he was being loaned to the Rangers. While Mešár had hoped to play with the Rocket for the rest of the season, the Canadiens' development staff believed he would benefit more from playing at the top of the lineup in Kitchener. On arrival he said that "I want to be a leader here. I want to get some points and help the team win." In his debut with the Rangers on October 21, he scored a goal and three assists in a 7–2 victory over the Sudbury Wolves.

International play

Mešár made his debut with the Team Slovakia's U18 team at the 2021 Hlinka Gretzky Cup, managing two goals and six assists and winning a silver medal with the team. He was then selected for the U20 team for the abortive 2022 World Junior Ice Hockey Championships, playing two games before they were cancelled because of the Omicron variant.

Career statistics

Regular season and playoffs

International

References

External links
 

2004 births
Living people
Kitchener Rangers players
Laval Rocket players
Montreal Canadiens draft picks
National Hockey League first-round draft picks
People from Kežmarok District
Sportspeople from the Prešov Region
HK Poprad players
Slovak ice hockey right wingers
Slovak expatriate ice hockey players in Canada